is a Japanese actress and lyricist who is represented by the talent agency, Act21. As a lyricist, she is nicknamed Shu.

Biography
During high school at 2005, Shuko debuted in the stage play, Han Sāsu no Nichijō, which was staged by her current agency. In the summer of 2007, she auditioned for the film, Nasu Shōnenki, and passed. Shuko's television drama debut was in the Fuji TV drama, Taiyo to Umi no Kyoshitsu. In 2008, she participated as an initial member of the girl unit, JK21. Shuko later graduated in less than a year, but that became an occasion for her to work as a lyricist.

Her hobbies are playing the piano, buyō dancing, and horseback riding. She has a friendship with Hanshin Tigers coach, Yutaka Wada. The actress she most respects is Eri Fukatsu.

Filmography

TV series

Films

References

External links
Official profile 
 

21st-century Japanese actresses
Japanese lyricists
1991 births
Living people
Writers from Nara Prefecture
Actors from Nara Prefecture